Andrew John Poole (born 6 July 1960) is an English former footballer who played as a goalkeeper. He spent four years at Northampton Town between 1978 and 1982 before entering the non-league scene after unsuccessful spells with Wolverhampton Wanderers and Port Vale.

Career
Poole played for Mansfield Town, before signing with Northampton Town in 1978. Under Mike Keen's stewardship, the "Cobblers" finished 19th in the Fourth Division in 1978–79, two places and two points above the re-election zone. They rose to 13th in 1979–80 under new boss Clive Walker, and Poole was voted as the club's Player of the Year. However, after Bill Dodgin took over at the County Ground, Northampton finished 10th in 1980–81, before dropping to third-from-bottom of the English Football League in 1981–82, and having to seek re-election. Poole started the 1982–83 season with Wolverhampton Wanderers, before he joined Port Vale in March 1983. His debut came in a 1–1 draw with local rivals Crewe Alexandra at Vale Park on 5 March, but after just one more match he had his contract cancelled that same month. Both Wolves and the "Valiants" went on to win promotion out of the Second Division and Fourth Division respectively in 1982–83. He moved on to Gillingham, Nuneaton Borough, Coventry Sporting, Worcester City, Buckingham Town, Kettering Town and finally Brackley Town; where he served as player-manager.

Career statistics
Source:

Honours
Individual
Northampton Town F.C. Player of the Year: 1979–80

References

1960 births
Living people
Footballers from Chesterfield
English footballers
Association football goalkeepers
Mansfield Town F.C. players
Northampton Town F.C. players
Wolverhampton Wanderers F.C. players
Port Vale F.C. players
Gillingham F.C. players
Nuneaton Borough F.C. players
Coventry Sporting F.C. players
Worcester City F.C. players
Buckingham Town F.C. players
Kettering Town F.C. players
Brackley Town F.C. players
English Football League players
National League (English football) players
Association football player-managers
English football managers